Daniel Judah Lasker (born April 5, 1949) is an American-born Israeli scholar of Jewish philosophy. As of 2017, he is Professor Emeritus in the Department of Jewish thought at Ben Gurion University of the Negev.

Biography 
Born on April 5, 1949 in Flint, Michigan, United States, to Arnold and Miriam Lasker, he grew up in Orange, New Jersey, where his father served as a congregational Rabbi. As a teenager he was active in USY and served as chapter head and on the regional board. He received his B.A., M.A.  and PhD from Brandeis University, all in the Department of Near Eastern and Judaic Studies, he also was a visiting research student at The Hebrew University of Jerusalem. His dissertation was advised by Alexander Altmann and is titled "Jewish Philosophical Polemics Against Christianity in the Middle Ages".

He married Debbie (Debora) Dworkin in 1973. They have five children. In 1978 he made Aliyah to Beer Sheva, Israel, where he still lives.

Work 
Lasker served as a faculty member in the Goldstein-Goren Department of Jewish Thought at Ben Gurion University of the Negev (1978–2017) and as of 2017 is a professor emeritus. He served as department chair and was the incumbent of the Norbert Blechner Chair of Jewish Values. His main field of research and teaching is Medieval Jewish philosophy.

He has taught as well at Yale University, Princeton University, Ohio State University, University of Toronto, Yeshiva University, University of Texas at Austin, University of Washington, Boston College, Queens College, Ahva College, Kirkland College, the Jewish Theological Seminary of America and Gratz College.

He also served as the vice president of the Society for Judaeo-Arabic Studies which is housed at the Ben Zvi institute, Jerusalem.

Research 
His areas of interest are medieval Jewish philosophy (including the thought of Judah Halevi, Maimonides, and Hasdai Crescas), the Jewish-Christian debate, Karaite Judaism , and other issues in Jewish theology and law. His first book, Jewish Philosophical Polemics Against Christianity (1977; second edition, 2007), details the use of philosophy in the medieval Jewish critique of Christianity. His most recent book, co-authored with Johannes Niehoff-Panagiotidis and David Sklare, is Theological Encounters at a Crossroads: A Preliminary Edition of Judah Hadassi’s Eshkol ha-kofer, First Commandment, and Studies of the Book’s Judaeo-Arabic and Byzantine Contexts (2019). This book serves as a partial edition and translation of a twelfth-century Karaite book of commandments and theology. His other books are an edition and translation of Hasdai Crescas’ Refutation of the Christian Principles (1990, 1992); (with Sarah Stroumsa), The Book of Nestor the Priest (1996), which presents the texts and translations of the earliest extant Jewish anti-Christian polemic, written in Judaeo-Arabic and then translated into Hebrew; From Judah Hadassi to Elijah Bashyatchi: Studies in Late Medieval Karaite Philosophy (2008), which describes developments in Karaite philosophy from the twelfth to fifteenth centuries in the Byzantine Empire He has also co-edited a jubilee volume and three conference proceedings and authored over 250 other publications.

Contributions to Research 
Lasker’s publications in the field of Jewish-Christian polemics have emphasized the extent to which the critique of Christianity is an integral part of Jewish theological self-definition. Thus, in those Jewish communities in which Jews engaged in rational speculation - the Islamic east, Iberia, Southern France, and Italy - arguments against Christianity were a regular part of their discussions. Among the important thinker-polemicists from these areas were Saadia Gaon, Moses Nahmanides, Hasdai Crescas, Joseph Albo, and Isaac Abravanel. In contrast, northern European Jewish communities, which generally eschewed rationalism, rarely wrote specifically anti-Christian treatises. Only under extreme stress did Jews in northern Europe write specifically polemical compositions, and their works were concentrated on exegesis and not theology. Lasker’s conclusion is that, in contrast to the accepted historiographical narrative, Jewish anti-Christian polemical activity is not necessarily a response to Christian missionary pressure; the medieval Jewish critique of Christianity is much more complex than that. In addition, a full understanding of medieval Jewish philosophy requires attention to the interreligious polemical motives behind the philosophical discussions.

Lasker’s studies of Karaism and Karaite philosophy have demonstrated the close connection between Karaite and Rabbanite Jewish thought. By publishing articles which survey Karaite intellectual achievements from the tenth to nineteenth centuries, he has shown that Karaite thought has been as dynamic as Rabbanite thought. Starting at the end of the thirteenth century, Karaite authors were greatly influenced by Maimonides and incorporated many of his theological insights into their work. Thus, Lasker has challenged the view that Karaites remained loyal to the Kalam theology of the earliest Karaite thinkers such that Karaism and Karaite thought are unchanging and static. The interplay between Rabbanite and Karaite thought continued into the nineteenth century in eastern Europe before the Karaite communities there until the twentieth century when these communities began to deny their connection to Judaism .

References

External links
 Professor Daniel J. Lasker's web page at Ben Gurion University
 List of Article on RAMBI, Index of Articles on Jewish Studies.

Living people
1949 births